Lorelei is a dark rock band formed in Pittsburgh in 2000 by Dan Barone and Susannah Bailis.

History
Lorelei started with an ensemble of only two bassists.  Drummer Thad Kellstadt joined in 2001, and by June the trio recorded their debut EP, My Assassin, which was good enough for the Kill Rock Stars compilation album Fields and Streams. They released their first full album, Our Minds Have Been Electrified on Ice-Made Records in late 2002.

Discography

Joan Jett 		
Rider 	
Ambush 
Not Yet 
As Long as It's Pink 	
Sirens 
Red Boots 
Crusader Style 
Guitar Eternal 		
Switch

References

Musical groups established in 2000
Musical groups from Pittsburgh
Dark rock groups